This is a list of all The Tonight Show Starring Johnny Carson episodes that aired between January 1, 1970 and December 31, 1970.

1970

January

February

March

April

May

June

July

August

September

October

November

December

References

Tonight Show Starring Johnny Carson, The
Tonight Show Starring Johnny Carson, The
The Tonight Show Starring Johnny Carson